Keith De Casseres (27 May 1910 – 23 February 2003) was a Jamaican sports shooter who represented the West Indies Federation at the 1960 Summer Olympics. He competed in the 50 metre pistol event.

References

1910 births
2003 deaths
Jamaican male sport shooters
Olympic shooters of the British West Indies
Shooters at the 1960 Summer Olympics
Commonwealth Games competitors for Jamaica
Shooters at the 1966 British Empire and Commonwealth Games
Sportspeople from Kingston, Jamaica